This page lists Kerala Cities by the nominal GDP per capita and the  financial good health.

District-wise per capita (2018–2019)

References

 GDP
Kerala Cities by GDP
Kerala, GDP
Cities by GDP per capita
Lists of cities by GDP